The Pucciniaceae are a family of rust fungi that cause plant diseases, mainly on cereals such as wheat. The family contains 20 genera and over 4900 species.

Genera
Genera in the Pucciniaceae include:
 Chrysella
 Chrysocyclus
 Chrysopsora
 Cleptomyces
 Coleopucciniella
 Corbulopsora
 Cumminsiella
 Cystopsora
 Endophyllum
 Gymnosporangium
 Kernella
 Miyagia
 Polioma
 Puccinia
 Ramakrishnania
 Roestelia
 Stereostratum
 Uromyces
 Xenostele
 Zaghouania

References

External links

Fungal plant pathogens and diseases
Basidiomycota families
Pucciniales
Taxa named by François Fulgis Chevallier
Taxa described in 1826